Dracaena trifasciata is a species of flowering plant in the family Asparagaceae, native to tropical West Africa from Nigeria east to the Congo. It is most commonly known as the snake plant, Saint George's sword, mother-in-law's tongue, and viper's bowstring hemp, among other names. Until 2017, it was known under the synonym Sansevieria trifasciata.

Description
It is an evergreen perennial plant forming dense stands, spreading by way of its creeping rhizome, which is sometimes above ground, sometimes underground. Its stiff leaves grow vertically from a basal rosette.

The specific epithet trifasciata means "three bundles".

The plant exchanges oxygen and carbon dioxide using the crassulacean acid metabolism process, which allows them to withstand drought. The microscopic pores on the plant's leaves, called the stomata and used to exchange gases, are opened only at night to prevent water from escaping via evaporation in the hot sun. 
It is a weed in some parts of northern Australia.

This plant is often kept as a houseplant due to its non-demanding maintenance. They require very little water and sun, making them perfect for dark rooms and apartments. 

To get this plant to go into bloom outside of its natural environment is difficult. Replicating its natural environment is possible. Its flowers vary from greenish white to cream-colored — some are fragrant at night, others not at all — and have a sticky texture.

Common names
Dracaena trifasciata is commonly called "mother-in-law's tongue", "Saint George's sword" or "snake plant", because of the shape and sharp margins of its leaves that resemble snakes. It is also known as the "viper's bowstring hemp", because it is one of the sources for plant fibers used to make bowstrings.

Cultivation and uses

Like some other members of its genus, D. trifasciata yields bowstring hemp, a strong plant fiber once used to make bowstrings.

It is now used predominantly as an ornamental plant, outdoors in warmer climates, and indoors as a houseplant in cooler climates. It is popular as a houseplant because it is tolerant of low light levels and irregular watering; during winter, it needs only one watering every couple of months. It will rot easily if overwatered. It is commonly recommended to beginners interested in cultivating houseplants for its easy care.  

The NASA Clean Air Study found D. trifasciata has the potential to filter indoor air, removing 4 of the 5 main toxins involved in the effects of sick building syndrome. However, its rate of filtration is too slow for practical indoor use.

It can be propagated by cuttings or by dividing the rhizome. The first method has the disadvantage that the variegation will be lost.

D. trifasciata is considered by some authorities a potential weed in Australia, although widely used as an ornamental, in the tropics outdoors in pots and garden beds and in temperate areas as an indoor plant.

The plant contains saponins which are mildly toxic to dogs and cats and can lead to gastrointestinal upset if consumed.

In South Africa, it is also used to treat ear infections.

Varieties and cultivars

Numerous cultivars have been selected, many of them for variegated foliage with yellow or silvery-white stripes on the leaf margins. Popular cultivars include 'Compacta', 'Goldiana', 'Hahnii', 'Laurentii', 'Silbersee', and 'Silver Hahnii'. 'Hahnii' was discovered in 1939 by William W. Smith, Jr. in the Crescent Nursery Company, New Orleans, Louisiana. The 1941 patent  was assigned to Sylvan Frank Hahn, Pittsburgh, Pennsylvania.

The variety D. trifasciata var. laurentii, together with the cultivars 'Bantel's Sensation' 
and 'Golden Hahni' have gained the Royal Horticultural Society's Award of Garden Merit.

Cultural significance
In its native range in Africa, a yellow-tipped cultivar is associated with Oya, the female Orisha of storms. In Nigeria it is commonly linked with Ogun, the Orisha of war, and is used in rituals to remove the evil eye. In Brazil its common name Espada de São Jorge links it to Saint George, who by syncretism is also associated with Orisha Ogun.

This plant is visible on the porch in Grant Wood's 1930 painting, American Gothic.

Gallery

References

External links 

 
https://plantingarden.com/10-types-of-snake-plants/

trifasciata
Flora of West Tropical Africa
Garden plants of Africa
House plants
Low light plants